The NATYS: New Acts of The Year Showcase, previously known as The Hackney Empire New Act of the Year, is an annual industry showcase that promotes new waves of emerging Comedy and Variety acts.  It ran at the Hackney Empire Theatre from 1988 until 2010. Since then it has toured round London theatres and performance spaces, playing the Barbican Theatre, Stratford Circus, Bloomsbury Theatre, Leicester Square Theatre and The Bernie Grant Arts Centre.

History 
Roland and Claire Muldoon, of underground theatre group CAST, pioneered "new variety", auditioning many of the acts that became the new wave of comedy and performance in the UK. The process evolved into the New Act of the Year Show produced by Claire and compered by Roland from 1982. In 1986 they took over the Hackney Empire and ran the NATY from 1987, with Linda Smith winning that year's award. It is currently produced by New Variety Lives, Which is managed by Roland and Claire Muldoon, alongside Frank Sweeney and Tony Goodrick. The 2011 final was held at the Barbican Theatre, the 2012 final at Stratford Circus and both 2013 and 2014 finals were held at The Bloomsbury Theatre and returning there for the 2015 NATYS Showcase final. The 2016 Showcase Final was held at The Leicester Square Theatre.

Previous winners include Stewart Lee, Ardal O'Hanlon and Linda Smith. Harry Hill, Russell Brand and Simon Amstell were finalists. The final has been compered for many years by alternative comedian Arthur Smith.

In 2004, William Cook of The Guardian wrote that it "may not be the best-known comedy award, but it might well be our most important".

The 2006 final was considered to be "the best since 1994" according to Cook. After the 2011 final, held at the Barbican Centre, Bruce Dessau of the London Evening Standard said the line-up confirmed ‘that there is more to the current comedy boom than Michael McIntyre wannabes exploring their man-drawers’, Arthur Smith said of the night, "I cannot recall another line up with a more eclectic range of styles and delivery"..

In 2012, The Stage described it as a "display of endurance, sweat, and probable performance enhancing drugs", and "the most important show of the year for new comedy and variety talent"

The 2022 installment was co produced by Soho Theatre's New comedy Promoter team and took place at the Bernie Grant Arts Centre in Tottenham. It was hosted by Curtis Walker.

Rules and eligibility 
Entrants are acts seeking to become established on the live comedy circuit that are not as yet full-time paid professional acts, must have performed for at least one year and have recommendations from two established promoters/agents/venues. Previous finalists do not qualify.

Winners and finalists 

 2022 - The Bernie Grant Arts Centre (Co-Produced by Soho Theatre) 

 Viggo Venn - Top of the Bill
 Roman Harris - First Runner Up
 Dan Wye - Second Runner Up
 Lorna Rose Treen
 Flat and the curves
 Caroline Madds
 Dee Allum
 Kathryn Higgins
 Adam Flood
 Luke Chilton
 Mark Flynn
 Joshua Bethania
 Andy Watts
 Eugene Dusauzay

 2020 - The Hackney Empire

 Ali Woods - Top of the Bill
 Adam Coumas - Runner Up
 Blake AJ - Runner Up
 Sheba Montserrat
 Angelica
 Charlie Partridge
 Iona Fortune (Anna Dominey)
 Jerry Bakewell
 Katherine Kenway
 Rob Copland
 Sue Gives a F**k (Chris Nelson)
 Trevor Bickles

2019 - The Hackney Empire 
 Njambi McGrath - Top of The Bill
 Eamon Goodfellow - Second Place
 Mad Ron (Steve Lee) - Third place
 Nicole Harris
 JennyBSide
 Chris Allen
 Nicholas De Santo
 Audrey Heartburn (Tracey Collins)
 Trev Tokabi
 Kuan-Wen Huang
 Matt Hutchinson
 El Baldiniho
 Josh Jones
 Patrick Healy
 Susie Steed

2018 - Rich Mix
 Ada Campe (Naomi Paxton)- Top of The Bill
 Maggie Kowalski - Second Place
 Huge Davies - Joint third place
 Bunny Hopkyns (Bruce Williams) - Joint third place
 Mary O'Connell
 Paul Cox
 Ellis & Rose
 Jake Howie
 Kevin O'Connell
 Amy Hooplovin'
 Wisebowm (Steve Whiteley)
 Dannie Grufferty
 Will Mars
 John Meagher
 Jon Udry

2017 - Leicester Square Theatre
 Rahul Kohli- Top of The Bill
 Roland SaundersTV-TV - Second Place
 Sindhu Vee - Joint third place
 Phil Lucas - Joint third place
 Arielle Souma
 Claire Lenahan
 EiLeAnn Harris
 Enda Muldoon
 Joshua Robertson (Yeah Man)
 Lauren Pattison
 Michael Clarke
 Rasputin's Lunchbox
 The Establishment (Dan Lees & Neil Frost)
 The Monks (Yazz Fetto & Kevin Moore)

2016 - Leicester Square Theatre
 Bilal Zafar - Top of the Bill
 Jimmy Bird - second place
 Emma Sidi - joint third place
 Josh Pugh - joint third place
 Revan and Fennel - Fourth place			
Thomas Rackham							
President Obonjo				
Mr Spooky (Joseph Murphy)					
Luca Cupani				
Svetlana the Oligarch's Wife		
Patrick Brusnahan			
Bucket					
Dave Green

2015 - The Bloomsbury Theatre 
 Daniel Duffy (Michael Stranney) - Top of the Bill
 Jenny Collier - joint second place
 The Herbert (Spencer Jones) - joint second place
 Francis Foster - third place
 Ashley Haden
 Cheekykita
 Chris Betts
 Don Biswas
 The Jest
 Joe Sutherland
 Josh R. Cherry
 Mikey Bharj
 Nick Elleray
 Rachel Fairburn
 Sean Patrick

2014 - The Bloomsbury Theatre 
 Alasdair Beckett-King - Top of the Bill
 Garrett Millerick - second place
 Twayna Mayne - joint third place
 Kelly Kingham - joint third place
 Archie Maddocks
 Candy Gigi Markham
 Jo Coffey
 Nick Hodder
 Pete Dobbing
 Thomas Ward
 Thünderbards
 Tina T'urner Tea Lady (Tracey Collins)
 Vinegar
 Wilson

2013 - The Bloomsbury Theatre
 Paul F Taylor - Top of the Bill
 Sam Savage - runner up
 Darren Walsh - runner up
 Alex Perry 
 Anna Devitt
 Quint Fontana (Andy Davies)
 Fern Brady  
 Four Screws Loose
 Jay Cowle
 Jonny & The Baptists
 Lindsay Sharman 
 Mark Niel 
 Nabil Abdulrahid
 Nicky Wilkinson
 Stuart Hossack 
 Tony Marrese

2012 - Stratford Circus 
 Patrick Cahill - winner
 Mark Stephenson - second place
 Adams and Rea - third place
 Bobby Mair
 Mark Simmons
 Electro Future Beard Club
 Luke Meredith
 Under Dogs
 Mae Martin
 Russella
 Tony Cowards
 George Rowe
 Stuart Mitchell
 Myra Dubois

2011 - The Barbican
 David Mills - winner
 Prince Abdi - joint second place
 Julian Deane - joint second place
 Darius Davies - third place
 Jav Jarquin - fourth place
 Nat Tapley
 Steve Aruni & Henry The Hoover
 Asian Provocateurs
 Joe Wells
 Rachel Parris
 David Trent
 Tania Edwards
 McNeil & Pamphilon
 How do I get up there?

2010 - The Hackney Empire (final show at this venue)
 Abandoman - winner
 Inel Tomlinson - second place
 Frisky & Mannish - third place
 Andrew Ryan - fourth place
 Luke Benson
 Jo Selby as Tatiana Ostrakova
 Luke Graves
 Giacinto Palmieri
 Val Lee
 Nathaniel Metcalfe
 Alan Hudson
 Dave Gibson
 Alyssa Kyria as Ariadne the Greek WAG
 Richard Rycroft
 Sir Harold Hackney, Alternative Mayor of London

2009
 Fergus Craig - winner
 Seann Walsh - second place
 David James - third place
 Ross Ashcroft
 Ro Campbell
 Gary Colman
 Jon Kudlick
 Lady Garden
 Grainne Maguire
 Moonfish Rhumba
 Craig Murray
 Colin Owens
 Jim Park
 Jason Patterson
 Piff the Magic Dragon
 Ahir Shah

2008
 Steve Weiner - winner
 Pippa Evans as Loretta Maine - second place
 Andi Osho - third place
 Rachel Boxall
 Dylan Bray
 Pat Burtscher
 Brothers Gribble
 The Heresy Project
 Gerry Howell
 Emannual Kenallos as Manos the Greek
 Frank Sanazi
 Kate Smurthwaite
 Christian Steel
 Vikki Stone
 Jack Whitehall
 Imran Yusuf

2007
 Luke Toulson - winner
 Liz Carr - second place
 Gareth Richards - third place
 Crispin Flintoff - runner-up
 Christian Lee - runner-up
 Isma Almas
 Evie Anderson
 Tamika Campbell
 Matt Grantham
 Dan Hoy
 Joe Kay
 Teak Show
 Holly Walsh
 David Whitney
 Maureen Younger

2006
 Joe Wilkinson - winner
 Diane Morgan - second place
 Stuart Goldsmith - third place
 Paul H Allen
 Matt Devereux
 Duncan Edwards
 Michael Fabbri
 Helen Keen
 Sarah-Louise Young
 Martine Pepper
 Ray Presto
 Stanley Silver
 Al Stick
 Tomi Walamies
 Robert White

2005
 Henning Wehn - winner
 Matt Green - second place
 Papa CJ - third place
 Gareth Berliner
 Simon Brodkin as Lee 'Nelsy' Nelson
 Stephen Carlin
 Janice Phayre
 Griff Griffiths
 Simon Green & James Connelly

2004
 Peter Aterman – winner
 Kerry Godliman - second
 Ava Vidal – third equal
 Jaik Campbell – finalist
 Roisin Conaty – finalist
 Nelson David – finalist
 James Goldbury – finalist
 Pablo – finalist
 Del Strain – finalist
 Reverend Dick Tate – finalist
 Vinell, Camel, Kiernan – finalist

2003
 Matt Kirshen – winner
 Rhod Gilbert – second
 Simon Amstell – finalist
 Del Strain – finalist
 Ross Wagman - finalist

2002
 Graham Anthony – winner
 Nina Conti – second
 Steve Day – finalist
 Henrik Elmer - finalist
 Vicky Frango – finalist
 Patrick Monahan – finalist
 Dave Palmer aka Dave Dynamite – finalist
 Verity Welch - finalist
 Graeme Casey - finalist

2001
 Men in Coats – winner
 Rob Deering – second
 Les Hommes Sans Noms (Andy Sinclair and Jim Woodcock- finalist
 James Holmes – finalist
 Inder Manocha - finalist
 Adrian Poynton - finalist

2000
 Paul Hickman – winner
 Shaparak Khorsandi - second
 Mark Felgate – finalist
 Russell Brand – finalist
 Francesca Martinez – finalist
 The Funjabis – finalists
 John Ryan – finalist
 Cole Parker – finalist

1999
 Anton - winner
 Daniel Kitson - runner-up
 Paul Sinha – third
 Mary Bourke – finalist
 Shirley Goorwich - finalist
 Sally Smith - finalist

1998
 Hitchcock's Half Hour (Neil Cole and Tom Hillenbrand) - winner
 Jocelyn Jee Esien - third
 Catherine Tate - finalist
 Susan Vale - finalist
 Micky Flanagan - finalist
 Lee Canterbury - finalist

1997
 Jon Reed – winner
 The Fluffy Brothers
 Natalie Haynes
 R David

1996
 Noel Britten – winner
 Gina Yashere - finalist
 Kevin Precious - finalist
 Noel Kelly - finalist
 Jimbo - finalist

1995
 Lee Mack - finalist

1994 - The Hackney Empire
 Ardal O'Hanlon/Wara - joint winners
 Ricky Grover - third
 Kevin Gildea - fourth
 Junior Simpson - finalist
 Simon Lipson - finalist
 Simon Pegg - finalist

1993
 Ronni Ancona - winner
 Tim Vine – runner-up
 Mel Barnes (Wilson) - finalist
 Sally Holloway - finalist 
 Pommy Johnson - finalist
 Simon Lipson - finalist
 Ben Miller - finalist
 Jack Russell - finalist

1991
 Paul Tonkinson - winner
 Nick Wilty - finalist
 Neville Raven - finalist
 Martin Davies - finalist

1990
 Stewart Lee - winner

1989
 Keith Dover – winner
 Niall MacAnna - second

1987
 Linda Smith – winner

References

External links 
 Hackney Empire official site
 Details for 2007
 New Variety Lives website
 

British comedy and humour awards
London awards
Awards established in 1982
1982 establishments in the United Kingdom